The 2018–19 season is Club Atlético Independiente's 6th consecutive season in the top-flight of Argentine football. The season covers the period from 20 July 2018 to 30 June 2019.

Current squad

Out on loan

Transfers

In

Out

Pre-season and friendlies

Friendlies

Overview

Primera División

Standings

Matchday

Copa Argentina

Round of 64

Round of 32

Copa Libertadores

Round of 16 

Independiente won 3–0 on aggregate

Quarter-final 

River Plate won 3-1 on aggregate

Copa Sudamericana

First stage

Suruga Bank Championship

Notes

References 

Club Atlético Independiente seasons
Independiente